A standing army is a permanent, often professional, army. It is composed of full-time soldiers who may be either career soldiers or conscripts. It differs from army reserves, who are enrolled for the long term, but activated only during wars or natural disasters, and temporary armies, which are raised from the civilian population only during a war or threat of war, and disbanded once the war or threat is over. Standing armies tend to be better equipped, better trained, and better prepared for emergencies, defensive deterrence, and particularly, wars. The term dates from approximately 1600 AD, although the phenomenon it describes is much older.

History

Ancient history

Mesopotamia
Sargon of Akkad, the founder of the Akkadian Empire, is believed to have formed the first standing professional army. Tiglath-Pileser III of Assyria (ruled 745–727 BC) created Assyria's first standing army. Tiglath-Pileser III disbanded militias and instead paid professional soldiers for their services. His army was composed largely of Assyrian soldiers, but was supplemented with foreign mercenaries and vassal states. The standing army he created was the most sophisticated administrative and economic institution of its time, and was the engine of Assyrian economy which capitalized on warfare.

Ancient Greece
In ancient Greece, the city-states' (poleis) armies were essentially drafted citizen militias. The exception was in ancient Sparta, which had a standing army that trained year-round (and not only in summertime). Through the 5th century, they comprised the only professional soldiers in ancient Greece, aside from hired mercenaries. However, the Spartan army commonly consisted of helots (serfs), who considerably outnumbered the Spartiates, as well as numerous allies of Sparta.

Philip II of Macedon instituted the first true professional Hellenic army, with soldiers and cavalrymen paid for their service year-round, rather than a militia of men who mostly farmed the land for subsistence and occasionally mustered for campaigns.

Ancient China
The Western Zhou maintained a standing army, enabling them to effectively control other city states and spread their influence. Unlike the Western Zhou, the Eastern Zhou initially did not have a standing army. Instead they drafted militias from around 150 city states. While the Eastern Zhao did not initially maintain a standing army, the state of Jin became the first to do so in 678 BCE. The first professional army in China was established by the Qin dynasty in 221 BCE, which ushered Imperial China. Under the Qin dynasty, wars were fought by trained vocational soldiers instead of relying on temporary soldiers.

Ancient India
In Ancient India, warfare was first attested during the Vedic period. However, warfare was primarily waged between various clans and kingdoms solely by the kshatriya class during times of conflict. True standing armies in India developed under the Mahajanapadas, which relied on paid professional soldiers year round. The most prominent of the Mahajanapadas was the Kingdom of Magadha. It is accepted that the first standing army of India was created in Maghada by the ruler Bimbisara.

Ancient Rome
Under the reign of Augustus, the first Roman emperor, a standing professional army of the Roman Empire was gradually instituted, with regularized pay. This professional force of legionaries was expensive to maintain, but supported the authority of the empire, not only as combat troops but also as provincial police forces, engineers, and guards. Legionaries were citizen volunteers entitled to a discharge bounty upon 25 years of honorable service; supplementing the legions were the auxilia, auxiliary forces composed of non-citizens in the provinces who typically earned citizenship as a reward for service.

Post-classical history

Ottoman Empire
The first modern standing armies on European soil during the Middle Ages were the Janissaries of the Ottoman Empire, which were formed in the 14th century under sultan Murad I.

France
The first Christian standing army since the fall of the Western Roman Empire to be paid with regular wages, instead of feudal levies, was established by King Charles VII of France in the 1430s while the Hundred Years' War was still raging. As he realized that France needed professional reliable troops for ongoing and future conflicts, units were raised by issuing "ordonnances" to govern their length of service, composition and payment. These compagnies d'ordonnance formed the core of the French gendarmes that dominated European battlefields in the late 15th and early 16th centuries. They were stationed throughout France and summoned into larger armies when needed. Provisions were also made for franc-archers and foot soldiers raised from the non-noble classes, but those units were disbanded at the end of the Hundred Years' War.

The bulk of the infantry for warfare was still provided by urban or provincial militias, raised from an area or city to fight locally and named for their recruiting grounds. Gradually these units became more permanent, and in the 1480s, Swiss instructors were recruited and some of the 'bandes' (militia) were combined to form temporary 'legions' of up to 9,000 men. The men would be paid and contracted and would receive training.

Henry II further regularised the French army by forming standing infantry regiments to replace the militia structure. The first, the Régiments de Picardie, Piémont, Navarre and Champagne, were called Les Vieux Corps (The Old Corps). It was normal policy to disband regiments after a war was over to save costs. The Vieux Corps and the King's own Household Troops (the Maison militaire du roi de France) were the only survivors.

Hungary
The Black Army, established in 1462 by Hungarian King, Matthias Hunyadi was the first Central/Eastern European standing army. However, while the Black Army was certainly the first standing field army in that part of Europe, Hungary in fact had maintained a permanent army in the form of garrisons of border fortresses since the 1420s.

Matthias recognized the importance and key role of early firearms in the infantry, which greatly contributed to his victories.
Every fourth soldier in the Black Army had an arquebus, which was an unusual ratio at the time. The high price of medieval gunpowder prevented them from raising it any further. The main troops of the army were the infantry, artillery and light and heavy cavalry.  The function of the heavy cavalry was to protect the light armoured infantry and artillery, while the other corps delivered sporadic, surprise assaults on the enemy.

Modern history

Spain
The Spanish Empire tercios were the first Spanish standing units composed of professional soldiers. Their pike and shot composition assured predominance in the European battlefields from the 16th century to the first half of the 17th century. Although other powers adopted the tercio formation, their armies fell short of the fearsome reputation of the Spanish, whose core of professional soldiers gave them an edge that was hard for other states to match.

Songhai Empire
In West Africa, the Songhai Empire under the Askia Mohammad I (1493–1528) possessed a full-time corps of warriors. Al-Sa'di, the chronicler who wrote the Tarikh al-Sudan, compared Askia Mohammad I's army to that of his predecessor; "he distinguished between the civilian and the army unlike Sunni Ali [1464–92] when everyone was a soldier." Askia Mohammad I is said to have possessed cynical attitudes towards kingdoms that lacked professional armies like his, notably in reference to the neighboring kingdoms in the land of Borgu.

England and Great Britain
Prior to the influence of Oliver Cromwell, England lacked a standing army, instead relying on militia organized by local officials, private forces mobilized by the nobility and hired mercenaries from Europe. This changed during the English Civil War, when Cromwell formed his New Model Army of 50,000 men. This professional body of soldiers proved more effective than untrained militia, and enabled him to exert control over the country. The army was disbanded by Parliament following the Restoration of the Monarchy in 1660, and the Cromwellian model was initially considered a failure due to various logistical and political problems with the force.

The Militia Act of 1661 prohibited local authorities from assembling militia without the approval of the king, to prevent such a force being used to oppress local opponents. This weakened the incentive for local officials to draw up their own fighting forces, and King Charles II subsequently assembled four regiments of infantry and cavalry, calling them his guards, at a cost of £122,000 paid out of his regular budget. This became the foundation of the permanent British Army. By 1685 it had grown to 7,500 soldiers in marching regiments, and 1,400 men permanently stationed in garrisons.  The Monmouth Rebellion in 1685 provided James II with a pretext to increase the size of the force to 20,000 men, and there were 37,000 in 1688, when England played a role in the closing stage of the Franco-Dutch War. In 1689, William III expanded the army to 74,000, and then to 94,000 in 1694.

Nervous at the power such a large force afforded the king whilst under his personal command, Parliament reduced the cadre to 7,000 in 1697.  Scotland and Ireland had theoretically separate military establishments, but they were de facto merged with the English force. The Bill of Rights 1689 officially reserved authority over a standing army to Parliament, not the king.

In his influential work The Wealth of Nations (1776), economist Adam Smith comments that standing armies are a sign of modernizing society, as modern warfare requires the increased skill and discipline of regularly trained standing armies.

United States
In the British Thirteen Colonies  in America, there was a strong distrust of a standing army not under civilian control. The President, however, retains command of the armed forces when they are raised, as commander-in-chief. The Framers' suspicion of a standing army is reflected in the constitutional requirement that the appointment and promotion of high-ranking military officers (like civil officers) be confirmed by the Senate. At the 1787 Constitutional Convention, Elbridge Gerry argued against a large standing army, comparing it, mischievously, to a standing penis: "An excellent assurance of domestic tranquility, but a dangerous temptation to foreign adventure." After the Battle of Bladensburg in 1814, during the War of 1812, in which the Maryland and Virginia militias were soundly defeated by the British Army, President James Madison commented, "I could never have believed so great a difference existed between regular troops and a militia force, if I not witnessed the scenes of this day."

See also
 Regular army
 List of militaries by country
 List of countries by number of military and paramilitary personnel
 List of armies by country

References

17th-century neologisms
Military sociology